18 Gramercy Park is a 19-story historic building in Manhattan, New York City, USA. Built as a hotel in 1927 and designed by the architectural firm Murgatroyd & Ogden, it was a women's temporary residence owned by The Salvation Army from 1963 to 2008. It was then known as the Parkside Evangeline.  In 2010, The Salvation Army sold the building to Eastgate Realty for US$60 million. The investors were the Zeckendorf family and Israeli billionaire Eyal Ofer. In 2012, the building was redesigned by Robert A.M. Stern Architects as a luxury 16-unit condominium building.

Residents have a key to Gramercy Park, a private park.

Neighborhood History 
The area which is now Gramercy Park was once in the middle of a swamp. In 1831, Samuel B. Ruggles, a developer and advocate of open space, proposed the idea for the park due to the northward growth of Manhattan. He bought the property, 22 acres of what was then a farm called "Gramercy Farm", from the heirs of James Duane, son of the former mayor, father of James Chatham Duane, and a descendant of Peter Stuyvesant. Ruggles then deeded the land on December 17, 1832, to five trustees, who pledge to hold 42 lots in trust to be used as parkland. To develop the property, Ruggles spent $180,000 to landscape it, draining the swamp and causing about a million horsecart loads of earth to be moved. He then laid out "Gramercy Square", deeding possession of the square to the owners of the 66 parcels of land he had plotted to surround it, and sought tax-exempt status for the park, which the city's Board of Aldermen granted in 1832. It was the second private square created in the city, after Hudson Square, also known as St. John's Park, which was laid out by the parish of Trinity Church. Numbering of the lots began at #1 on the northwest corner, on Gramercy Park West, and continued counter-clockwise: south down Gramercy Park West, then west to east along Gramercy Park South (East 20th Street), north up Gramercy Park East, and finally east to west along Gramercy Park North (East 21st Street).

As part of his overall plan for the square, Ruggles received permission on January 28, 1833, from the Board of Alderman to open up Fourth Avenue, which had been limited to use by trains, to vehicular traffic. He also brought about the creation by the state legislature of Lexington Avenue and Irving Place, two new north–south roads laid out between Third and Fourth Avenues and feeding into his development at the top and bottom of the park. The new streets reduced the number of lots around the park from 66 to 60. Gramercy Park was enclosed by a fence in 1833, but construction on the surrounding lots did not begin until the 1840s, due to the Panic of 1837. In one regard, this was fortunate, as the opening of the Croton Aqueduct in 1842 allowed new townhouses to be constructed with indoor plumbing. The first formal meeting of the park's trustees took place in 1844 at 17 Union Square (West), the mansion of James W. Gerard, which is no longer extant, having been demolished in 1938. By that time, the landscaping had already begun with the hiring of James Virtue in 1838, who planted privet inside the fence as a border; by 1839 pathways had been laid out and trees and shrubs planted. Major planting also took place in 1844 – the same year the park's gates were first locked – followed by additional landscaping by Brinley & Holbrook in 1916. These plantings had the effect of softening the parks' prim formal design.

Gramercy Park is now a quiet residential corner within New York's most unambiguously enduring neighborhood. It is the only park in Manhattan with a keyed entry, as it is a private park.  Access to the park is exclusive to people who live directly on the park's perimeter, which features a number of the city's most architecturally enchanting buildings, complete with wrought-iron gates, bluestone sidewalks, shaded lawns, and wooden benches. Owners at 18 Gramercy Park may purchase an annual key to the park. As of 2008, the cost for a key was $350, with a $1,000 fee for lost keys, which rises to $2,000 for a second instance. The Medeco locks are changed annually, and any property that does not pay the annual assessment of $7,500 per lot has its key privileges revoked. Additionally, the keys are very hard to duplicate. As of 2012, there were 383 keys in circulation, each individually numbered and coded.

Some of the area's notable previous residents include Henry James, Diminish Stuyvesant, Herman Melville, Edith Wharton, Stanford White, Oscar Wilde, and Winslow Homer.

Building Features
Since its completion in September 2012, the building has sold all of its units(many of which are full-floor residences), with many costing more than US$4,000 per square foot, including the three-level maisonette with a private passage. The units feature marble showers, Miele dishwashers and thick white-oak floors. The building features two rooftop porches, a club room, spa and wellness center, 24-hour porter, full-time staff(including concierge) and four exposures with park and horizon views. Pets are permitted.

Unit Prices 
18 Gramercy Park units have reportedly sold for between $10Million USD and $42Million USD for the 6,329 ft² duplex penthouse.

Redesign Building Architects 
One of the world's most celebrated architects, Robert A.M. Stern is a senior member of the Yale School of Engineering and an author and instructor with a significant enthusiasm for the improvement of New York urbanism. Robert A.M. Stern Architects, LLP, is a 265-person engineering and interior configuration firm with nearly 50 years of practice as a universal pioneer in private, business, and institutional projects. Previous projects include Manhattan's The Chatham condominium, London's Audley Square House, the Spangler Center at Harvard Business School and Hong Kong's 50 Connaught Road Central.

References

External links
Robert A. M. Stern Architects, LLP-Official Site
StreetEasy.com Building Listing

Residential buildings completed in 1927
Condominiums and housing cooperatives in Manhattan
Gramercy Park
The Salvation Army